The Five also known as  Harlan Coben’s The Five, is a British mystery thriller miniseries created by crime author Harlan Coben and written primarily by Danny Brocklehurst. Tom Cullen, O. T. Fagbenle, Lee Ingleby and Sarah Solemani star as childhood friends Mark, Danny, Slade, and Pru, who are reunited when DNA evidence left at a murder scene is revealed to be from Mark's younger brother Jesse, who disappeared twenty years earlier. The series first broadcast on 15 April 2016 on Sky1 and consists of ten episodes, with two episodes broadcast each week consecutively. Set in the fictional town of Westbridge, the series was filmed in Liverpool, Wirral, Runcorn and surrounding areas including Frodsham.

Plot
In 1995, four young school friends, Mark, Danny, Slade and Pru are left traumatized after Mark's five-year-old brother Jesse disappears after playing in the park with them. No trace of Jesse has ever been found. Serial killer  Jakob Marosi, who had been charged with five other murders, claimed that he killed Jesse. Jesse's parents, Julie and Alan, had given up all hope of ever finding the boy alive.

Twenty years on, Danny Kenwood is a Detective Sergeant working for Westbridge Police. When he attends the scene of a murder, he finds prostitute Annie Green, who has been brutally attacked with a hammer. A forensic analysis of DNA evidence from the crime scene provides a match for Jesse's DNA. An intricate web of trials and tribulations begins to unfold as the four childhood friends re-unite in the hope of finding Jesse alive.

Cast

Main

 Tom Cullen as Mark Wells, a lawyer in his 30s who aids in the search for missing people in his spare time
 Aedan Duckworth as young Mark
 Haris Giannakopoulos as younger Mark
 O. T. Fagbenle as D.S. Danny Kenwood, a detective working for Westbridge Police
 Freedom Doran as young Danny
 Lee Ingleby as Slade, a childhood friend of Mark, Danny and Pru, who runs a shelter for vulnerable young people
 Billy Kennedy as young Slade
 Sarah Solemani as Pru Carew, a doctor who has returned home after living in the United States for fourteen years
 Megan Bradley as young Pru

Supporting

 Alfie and Harry Bloor as Jesse Wells, Mark's brother, who has been missing for twenty years
 Don Warrington as Ray Kenwood, a retired police officer and Danny's father, who is suffering from severe Alzheimer's disease
 Wil Johnson as young Ray
 Lorraine Burroughs as Jennifer Kenwood, Danny's wife
 Hannah Arterton as D.C. Ally Caine, Danny's partner
 Tom Brittney as D.C. Ken Howells, the lead forensic scientist in Danny's team and Karl's best friend
 Vicky Myers as Selena Callaway, an IT consultant that is found dead
 Honeysuckle Weeks as Laura Marshall, a married woman having an affair with Mark
 Tom Price as Kenton Marshall, Laura's husband and a geography teacher
 Sophia La Porta as Britnay Shearer, a volunteer at Slade's shelter
 Martin McCreadie as D.C. Karl Hatchett, a forensic analyst in Danny's team who is attracted to Ally
 Arthur Byrne as young Karl
 Geraldine James as Julie Wells, Mark's mother
 Shauna Macdonald as young Julie
 Syrus Lowe as Larry / Larita, Mark's crossdressing paralegal secretary
 Michael Maloney as Alan Wells, Mark's father
 Canice Bannon as young Alan
 Jonathan Kerrigan as Stuart Carew, Pru's controlling husband
 Rade Serbedzija as Jakob Marosi, a serial killer convicted of five child murders
 Dragan Micanovic as young Marosi
 Barnaby Kay as D.I. Liam Townsend, Danny's superior
 Naomi Ackie as Gemma Morgan, a young woman who has been missing for five years
 Sam Swann as Matt Lohan / Mr X, an enigma
 Lee Boardman as Jay Newman, a local record producer with a murky past
 Dylan Jupp as Simon Marshall, Laura and Kenton's son
 Alexa Davies as Alexa Mills, a mysterious girl
 Niall Greig Fulton as Richard Payne, an employee of Porter with a connection to Alexa
 Charles De'Ath as Dominic Porter, the head of an IT firm and Callaway's former employer
 Stephen Boxer as Ron Hatchett, Karl's dying father
 Paul Warriner as Frank Lipton, an old friend of the Wells family

Episodes

References

External links

2016 British television series debuts
2016 British television series endings
2010s British drama television series
2010s British crime television series
English-language television shows
Serial drama television series
2010s British television miniseries
Sky UK original programming
Television series by Red Production Company
Television series by StudioCanal